Player names marked in bold went on to earn full international caps.

Group A

Iran
Head coach: Ali Doustimehr

Myanmar
Head coach:  Gerd Zeise

Head coach: Sasom Pobprasert

Yemen
Head coach: Ahmed Ali Qasem

Group B

Australia
Head coach: Paul Okon

Indonesia
Head coach: Indra Sjafri

United Arab Emirates
Head coach: Abdulla Mesfer

Uzbekistan
Head coach: Ravshan Khaydarov

Group C

China
Head coach: Zheng Xiong

Japan
Head coach: Masakazu Suzuki

South Korea

Head coach: Kim Sang-ho

Vietnam
Head coach:  Graechen Guillaume

Group D

Iraq
Head coach: Rahim Hameed

North Korea
Head coach: An Ye-gun

Oman
Head coach: Rasheed Jaber

Qatar
Head coach:  Félix Sánchez

References

External links
 

Squads